Herbert Thorne (1 August 1865 – 12 December 1956) was a Barbadian cricketer. He played in three first-class matches for the Barbados cricket team in 1891/92.

See also
 List of Barbadian representative cricketers

References

External links
 

1865 births
1956 deaths
Barbadian cricketers
Barbados cricketers
People from Saint John, Barbados